Pedro David Gallese Quiroz (born 23 February 1990) is a Peruvian professional footballer who plays as a goalkeeper for Major League Soccer club Orlando City and the Peru national team.

Club career

Universidad San Martín
Pedro Gallese began his youth career at Academia Tito Drago and Club Deportivo Junior FC before joining that academy at Universidad San Martín in 2007. He made his way through the youth system and debuted for the senior team on 25 June 2008 in a 4–0 victory against Atlético Minero. He made 63 appearances for the club and his performances earned him his first international call-up and eventual cap in 2014.

Loan to Atlético Minero
With his first team opportunities limited, Pedro Gallese joined Atlético Minero on loan for the 2009 season.

Juan Aurich
In 2015, Pedro Gallese decided to leave Universidad San Martín after 7 years at the club. Gallese signed for Juan Aurich and made his debut for the team on 6 February 2015 in a 2–1 win over Defensor La Bocana in the 2015 Torneo Descentralizado. Gallese played in the Copa Libertadores for the first time on 19 February 2015, making his continental debut in a 3–0 defeat to Tigres.

Veracruz
Gallese's performances in the Copa América Centenario in the United States in 2016 made him a target for several clubs. On 19 June 2016, Gallese eventually signed with Mexican club Veracruz. He made his debut for the team on 10 July in the 2016 Supercopa MX, losing the match against Guadalajara 2–0. In the first week of December 2019, Pedro Gallese was released by Veracruz after the club had been disaffiliated from Liga MX.

Loan to Alianza Lima
After falling out of favor under Veracruz manager Robert Siboldi the previous campaign, Gallese returned to Peru on a 12-month loan with Alianza Lima for the 2019 season.

Orlando City
On 17 January 2020, Gallese joined MLS team Orlando City. He made his debut for the team in the season opener on 29 February, keeping a clean sheet in a 0–0 draw against Real Salt Lake. On 31 July 2020, Gallese made the only save during a quarter-final penalty shoot-out victory over Los Angeles FC in the MLS is Back Tournament. On 21 November 2020, Gallese was again involved in a penalty shoot-out as Orlando played their first MLS playoff game in history against New York City FC. Gallese appeared to successfully save the fifth penalty kick which would have won the match for Orlando but the play was overturned by VAR and Gallese received a second yellow card for leaving his goal line early having already been booked in extra-time for time wasting. Ultimately Orlando won the match after defender Rodrigo Schlegel replaced Gallese in goal and saved a penalty in the seventh round of the shootout.

In August 2021, Gallese was named an MLS All-Star for the 2021 MLS All-Star Game.

In December 2022, Gallese signed a new contract with Orlando through 2024, with an additional option for the 2025 season.

International career
Pedro Gallese never appeared and was in reserve of Éder Hermoza of the Peru national under-17 football team for the 2007 FIFA U-17 World Cup held in South Korea.

Gallese made his senior international debut on 6 August 2014 in a friendly against Panama. He kept a clean sheet and saved a penalty in the 82nd minute of the 3–0 victory. Pedro Gallese was selected to the squad for the 2015 Copa América held in Chile, with Peru. They won the bronze medal. Gallese was also selected for the squad for the 2016 Copa América Centenario hosted in the United States. During the tournament he was named man of the match in Peru's defeat of Brazil, 1-0.

Pedro Gallese became first choice goalkeeper for Peru during 2018 World Cup qualifying. After having fractured his wrist during a Liga MX match with Veracruz in August 2017, Gallese returned for Peru on 5 October 2017. Despite still carrying the injury, Gallese shut out Argentina at La Bombonera with the 0–0 draw keeping Peru in the race to qualify for the 2018 FIFA World Cup. On 15 November 2017, Gallese was part of the team that qualified for the 2018 FIFA World Cup after Peru defeated New Zealand at the intercontinental playoff. His injury persisted but Gallese was able to keep a clean sheet in both games as Peru won 2–0 on aggregate, qualifying them for the World Cup for the first time in 36 years.

In May 2018, he was named in Peru's provisional squad and eventually made it into the final 23. He was the starting goalkeeper for Peru throughout the 2018 FIFA World Cup, but Peru were unable to qualify from the group stage of the tournament after two losses to Denmark and France. However, he was able to keep a clean sheet in their final group match, a 2–0 victory over Australia.

Gallese was once again selected as the starting goalkeeper for Peru in the 2019 Copa América, where he played a significant role in helping Peru to go to its first ever Copa América final for 44 years, including saving Luis Suárez's penalty in a quarter-final penalty shoot-out. Peru eventually lost to Brazil in the final 3–1.

Career statistics

Club

International

Honours

Club
Universidad San Martín
Peruvian Primera División winner: 2010
Copa Inca runner-up: 2014

Veracruz
Supercopa MX runner-up: 2016

Orlando City
U.S. Open Cup: 2022

International
Copa América third place: 2015
Copa América second place: 2019

Individual
MLS All-Star: 2021
MLS Save of the Year: 2022

References

External links

 

1990 births
Living people
Footballers from Lima
Peruvian footballers
Peruvian expatriate footballers
Association football goalkeepers
Atlético Minero footballers
Club Deportivo Universidad de San Martín de Porres players
Juan Aurich footballers
C.D. Veracruz footballers
Peruvian Primera División players
Liga MX players
Peru international footballers
2015 Copa América players
Copa América Centenario players
2018 FIFA World Cup players
2019 Copa América players
2021 Copa América players
Expatriate footballers in Mexico
Peruvian expatriate sportspeople in Mexico
Peruvian people of Italian descent
Peruvian people of African descent
Orlando City SC players
Peruvian expatriate sportspeople in the United States
Major League Soccer players